Balarud and Bala Rud may refer to:
 Bala Rud, Kerman
 Istgah-e Balarud
 Pol-e Bala Rud